Saint-Martin-d'Hardinghem is a commune in the Pas-de-Calais department in the Hauts-de-France region of France.

Geography
Saint-Martin-d'Hardinghem is a small suburb of Fauquembergues, 10 miles (16 km) to the southwest of Saint-Omer on the D158 road.

Population

Places of interest
 The church of St.Martin, dating from the thirteenth century.
 The Château d'Hervarre.

See also
Communes of the Pas-de-Calais department

References

Saintmartindardinghem